was a Japanese samurai of the Sengoku period, who served the Takeda clan.

References

Takeda retainers
Samurai
1529 births
1582 deaths